South Branch is a settlement located on the west coast of the island of Newfoundland in the province of Newfoundland and Labrador, Canada. South Branch is one of fifteen communities within the greater Codroy Valley area and is located alongside the Trans-Canada Highway (Route 1) between Channel-Port aux Basques and St. George's Bay.

History

South Branch began as a settlement for those who took part in the construction of the Newfoundland Railway.

Demographics 

See also
 List of cities and towns in Newfoundland and Labrador
 Division No. 4, Subdivision A, Newfoundland and Labrador
 Codroy Valley
 Codroy
 Millville, Newfoundland and Labrador
 St. Andrew's, Newfoundland and Labrador
 Upper Ferry, Newfoundland and Labrador
 Point Rosee

References

Populated places in Newfoundland and Labrador